Rembuyevo is a rural locality (a village) in Ukhtostrovskoye Rural Settlement of Kholmogorsky District, Arkhangelsk Oblast, Russia. The population was 331 as of 2010.

Geography 
Rembuyevo is located on the Severnaya Dvina River, 44 km north of Kholmogory (the district's administrative centre) by road. Volkovo is the nearest rural locality.

References 

Rural localities in Primorsky District, Arkhangelsk Oblast